Personality disorder not otherwise specified (PD-NOS) is a subclinical diagnostic classification for some DSM-IV Axis II personality disorders not listed in DSM-IV.

The DSM-5 does not have a direct equivalent to PD-NOS. However, the DSM-5 other specified personality disorder and unspecified personality disorder are substantially comparable to PD-NOS.

Additionally, the DSM-5 introduced the diagnosis Personality disorder - trait specified (PD-TS) as an alternative to allow the clinician to define the presentation in detail in terms of "impairment of personality functioning" and "pathological personality traits".

Diagnostic criteria
In all cases of non-specific diagnoses it is a requirement that the person meet the general criteria for personality disorders.

DSM-IV-TR
This diagnosis may be given when no other personality disorder defined in the DSM fits the patient's symptoms.

Four personality disorders were excluded from the main body of the DSM-IV-TR but this diagnosis may be used instead. The four excluded personality disorders are:
 Sadistic personality disorder
 Self-defeating personality disorder
 Depressive personality disorder
 Passive–aggressive personality disorder

DSM-5
The DSM-5 split PD-NOS into two diagnoses,Other Specified Personality Disorder and Unspecified Personality Disorder, that share the general criteria for personality disorders but allows the clinician to decide whether they want to specify the reason why the presentation does not meet the criteria for any specific personality disorder (e.g. mixed personality features).

ICD-10
The World Health Organization's ICD-10 defines two conceptually similar diagnoses:
 Other specific personality disorder for personality disorders that don't have a separate code. This diagnosis allows the following type specifiers: "eccentric", "haltlose", "immature", "narcissistic", "passive-aggressive", and "psychoneurotic".
 Personality disorder, unspecified for general personality disorder diagnoses.

ICD-11
ICD-11 uses general diagnoses with specifiers to fully describe a condition. The closest diagnosis to PD-NOS would be Personality disorder, severity unspecified.

Epidemiology
A 2004 meta-analysis estimated the prevalence of PD-NOS in patient samples between 8-13%. In structured interview studies it is the third most common diagnosis given, in unstructured studies it is the single most frequent diagnosis. Half the studies did not give further definition for the diagnosis, and those that did used "mixed" most often.

In another study out of 1760 psychotherapy referrals 21.6% was diagnosed exclusively with PD-NOS. In terms of severity patients with PD-NOS fall between a formal personality disorder diagnosis and no personality disorder. Patients who received PD-NOS as an additional diagnosis to their formal personality disorder diagnosis had the most severe problems.

See also 
 Not otherwise specified
 Eating disorder not otherwise specified
 Mood disorder not otherwise specified
 DSM-IV codes (personality disorders)

Notes

References

External links 

Personality disorders